Mugron mac Máel Cothaid (died 872), was the Máel Cothaid mac Fogartaig and King of Connacht from 848–872. Mugron mac Máel Cothaid succeeded to the throne of the Connachta in 848 after the death of Finsnechta mac Tommaltaig and was succeeded by Conchobar mac Taidg Mór.

References

 Byrne, Francis John (2001), Irish Kings and High-Kings, Dublin: Four Courts Press, 
 Gaelic and Gaelised Ireland, Kenneth Nicols, 1972.

872 deaths
People from County Roscommon
15th-century Irish monarchs
O'Conor dynasty
Year of birth unknown